La casa de los secretos  (lit. The House of Secrets) was the first and only season of the Peruvian version of the reality show Secret Story, based on the original French version. It started on September 20, 2012, on Frecuencia Latina. Nomination Day was set for Thursdays and Eviction was set for Mondays.

Housemates

Alex 
 Civil Status: Single
 Date of birth: 3 December 1988
 Zodiac Sign: Sagittarius
 Birthplace: Rocha, Uruguay
 Status: Evicted (Day 40)

Alvaro 
 Civil Status: Single
 Date of birth: 7 June 1991
 Zodiac Sign: Gemini
 Birthplace: Miraflores, Lima, Peru
 Status: Winner (Day 58)

Assad 
 Civil Status: Single
 Date of birth: 15 July 1989
 Zodiac Sign: Cancer
 Birthplace: Jesús María, Lima, Peru
 Status: Walked (Day 19)

Cecilia 
 Civil Status: Single
 Date of birth: 28 December 1980
 Zodiac Sign: Capricorn
 Birthplace: Barranco, Lima, Peru
 Status: Evicted (Day 54)

César 
 Civil Status: Single
 Date of birth: 6 October 1987
 Zodiac Sign: Libra
 Birthplace: Bellavista, Callao, Peru
 Status: Evicted (Day 47)

Edson 
 Civil Status: Single
 Date of birth: 26 September 1987
 Zodiac Sign: Libra
 Birthplace: Lima, Peru
 Status: 3rd Place (Day 58)

Fiorella 
 Civil Status: Single
 Date of birth: 13 May 1987
 Zodiac Sign: Taurus
 Birthplace: San Martín, Tarapoto, Peru
 Status: Evicted (Day 12)

Geraldine 
 Civil Status: Single
 Date of birth: 20 April 1990
 Zodiac Sign: Pisces
 Birthplace: Lima, Peru
 Status: Evicted (Day 57)

Hilda 
 Civil Status: Single
 Date of birth: 20 April 1986
 Zodiac Sign: Aries
 Birthplace: Lima, Peru
 Status: Evicted (Day 56)

Karina 
 Civil Status: Divorced
 Date of birth: 30 December 1981
 Zodiac Sign: Capricorn
 Birthplace: Lima, Peru
 Status: Walked (Day 41)

Ket 
 Civil Status: Single
 Date of birth: 25 March 1991
 Zodiac Sign: Aries
 Birthplace: Porto Alegre, Brazil
 Status: Evicted (Day 33)

Lissy 
 Civil Status: Single
 Date of birth: 3 August 1985
 Zodiac Sign: Leo
 Birthplace: Lima, Peru
 Status: 4th Place (Day 58)

Michael 
 Civil Status: Single
 Date of birth: 19 July 1991
 Zodiac Sign: Cancer
 Birthplace: Lima, Peru
 Status: 6th Place (Day 58)

Paco 
 Civil Status: Married
 Date of birth: 20 October 1982
 Zodiac Sign: Libra
 Birthplace: Chiclayo, Peru
 Status: Evicted (Day 19)

Rodrigo 
 Civil Status: Single
 Date of birth: 1 October 1991
 Zodiac Sign: Libra
 Birthplace: Lima, Peru
 Status: 5th Place (Day 58)

Sandra 
 Civil Status: Single
 Date of birth: 21 October 1992
 Zodiac Sign: Libra
 Birthplace: Lima, Peru
 Status: Evicted (Day 55)

Tatiana 
 Civil Status: Single
 Date of birth: 5 October 1991
 Zodiac Sign: Libra
 Birthplace: Moquegua, Peru
 Status: Evicted (Day 26)

Valentín 
 Civil Status: Single
 Date of birth: 25 July 1984
 Zodiac Sign: Leo
 Birthplace: Arequipa, Peru
 Status: Runner-Up (Day 58)

Houseguests

Susy 
Susy Diaz is an actress and former Congresswoman of Republic of Peru. She entered in the House on Day 13 and left on Day 14.

Conejo 
Miguel Rebosio is a former footballer. He entered in the House on Day 21 and left on Day 22.

Puchungo 
Puchungo Yañez is a former footballer. He entered in the House on Day 21 and left on Day 22.

Tongo 
Tongo is a singer of cumbia music. He entered in the House on Day 30 and left 2 hours later.

Jason 
Jason Day is an actor. He entered in the House on Day 36 and left 1 hour later.

Hermanos Yaipen 
Hermanos Yaipen or Yaipén Brothers are a group of cumbia music. They entered in the House on Day 51 and left 2 hours later.

Katty, Irina and Lisette 
Katty Rojas, Irina Grandez and Lisette Silva are peruan ballerinas. They entered in the House on Day 51 and left on Day 53.

Carla 
Carla García is the presenter of La Casa de los Secretos. She entered in the House on Day 59 and left 2 hours later.

Secrets
There are 18 secrets in the House for this first season.

Nominations Table

Notes:
 : Alex revealed his secret. He is automatically nominated by Secret Story as punishment.
 : Cecilia, César, Geraldine, Hilda, Lissy, Michael, Rodrigo and Sandra combined the nominations. As punishment they are automatically nominated by Secret Story, exempt Cecilia because she didn't vote for the housemates combined.
 : The housemates were evicted each day until remained 6 finalists for the finale.

Nomination Totals Received

External links
 Official Website 

2012 Peruvian television seasons
Secret Story (franchise)
2012 Peruvian television series debuts
2012 Peruvian television series endings
2010s Peruvian television series
Peruvian reality television series
Latina Televisión original programming